Soná District is a district (distrito) of Veraguas Province in Panama. The population according to the 2010 Panamanian census was 27,833; the latest official estimate (for 2019) is 29,774. The district covers a total area of 1,519 km². The capital lies at the city of Soná.

It also hosts the Soná Football Club 1835.

The mayor of the city is Aristides Ortiz Arosemena.

The city is referenced in Prison Break based on a local urban legend of an "underground prison".

Administrative divisions
Soná District is divided administratively into the following corregimientos:

Soná
Bahía Honda
Calidonia
Cativé
El Marañón
Guarumal
La Soledad
Quebrada de Oro
Río Grande
Rodeo Viejo
Hicaco

References

Districts of Panama
Veraguas Province